The Hundred of Bowaka, is a hundred in the County of Robe,  within the Limestone Coast region of South Australia.
The hundred is located at 36°55′38″S 140°1′33″E.

See also
Reedy Creek, South Australia

References

Limestone Coast
Bowaka